Allan Kroeker (born April 10, 1951, in Winnipeg, Manitoba) is a Canadian film and television director, cinematographer, screenwriter, film editor and film producer. He has the distinction of directing the series finales for Star Trek: Deep Space Nine, Star Trek: Voyager and Star Trek: Enterprise. He has also directed TV movies and episodic television.

Kroeker grew up in Winnipeg where he began his career producing films for the Mennonite Brethren Church and the Mennonite Central Committee.

References

1960 births
Canadian television directors
Canadian cinematographers
Canadian male screenwriters
Canadian film editors
Film producers from Manitoba
Film directors from Winnipeg
Living people
Writers from Winnipeg
Mennonite writers
Canadian Mennonites